Edward Louis Pepperell (born 22 January 1991) is an English professional golfer who plays on the European Tour. In February 2018, he won his first European Tour event at the Commercial Bank Qatar Masters. In October 2018, he won his second European Tour event at the Sky Sports British Masters.

Amateur career
Pepperell had a prominent amateur career, including finishing runner-up in the Boys Amateur Championship in 2009.

Professional career
Pepperell turned professional in 2011 but failed to earn a place on either the European or Challenge Tours, and he began 2012 playing on the mini-tours. However he received an invitation to the Allianz Open Côtes d'Armor Bretagne in May, the fourth event on the Challenge Tour schedule. He went on to win the event in a sudden-death playoff over Jeppe Huldahl and as a result secured his membership on the Challenge Tour.

In 2013, Pepperell placed tied 6th at the BMW PGA Championship at Wentworth and the next day won through the qualifier for the U.S. Open at Walton Heath to win a place in his first major.

Pepperell lost in a three-man sudden-death playoff at the Dubai Duty Free Irish Open in May 2015. On a very difficult final day in windy conditions, Pepperell shot a two-under 69, while all the other leaders were shooting over-par rounds, to come from seven strokes behind and join the playoff. Søren Kjeldsen won with a birdie on the first extra hole, after Pepperell and Bernd Wiesberger could not get up and down for birdie from the greenside areas. This was Pepperell's best-ever showing on the European Tour at the time and qualified him for the 2015 Open Championship, as the Irish Open was one of the Open Qualifying Series. He also entered the world top-100, getting him an invitation to play in the 2015 PGA Championship. In the summer of 2015 Pepperell finished tied for fourth in the Aberdeen Asset Management Scottish Open and tied for third in the KLM Open, lifting him to a career-high world ranking of 80.

From the summer of 2015 to early 2017, Pepperell's best performances on the European Tour were 8th places and he dropped out of the world top-500. However, he qualified for the 2017 U.S. Open through the European sectional qualifying at Walton Heath and had his best performance in a major championship, finishing tied for 16th.

In February 2018, Pepperell broke through and won his maiden European Tour event at the Commercial Bank Qatar Masters by a single stroke over Oliver Fisher. The win came in his 129th start on the tour. Later in 2018 he was runner-up in the Aberdeen Standard Investments Scottish Open, a result which earned him a place in the 2018 Open Championship the following week, where he tied for sixth at five-under-par after a final round 67, the best of the day. On 14 October 2018, Pepperell shot 72 to go wire-to-wire and hold off the challenge of Alexander Björk and win his second European Tour title of the season at the Sky Sports British Masters at Walton Heath Golf Club. With the victory, Pepperell moved to a career best 33rd in the Official World Golf Ranking.

Pepperell finished runner-up at the Hero Open in July 2022, one shot behind Sean Crocker. It was his first top-5 finish since 2019.

Amateur wins
2010 Berkshire Trophy, Welsh Men's Amateur Strokeplay
2011 Portuguese Amateur Championship

Professional wins (4)

European Tour wins (2)

European Tour playoff record (0–1)

Challenge Tour wins (1)

Challenge Tour playoff record (1–0)

Other wins (1)

Results in major championships
Results not in chronological order in 2020.

CUT = missed the half-way cut
"T" indicates a tie for a place
NT = No tournament due to COVID-19 pandemic

Summary

Most consecutive cuts made – 4 (2017 U.S. Open – 2019 Masters)
Longest streak of top-10s – 1

Results in The Players Championship

"T" indicates a tie for a place.

Results in World Golf Championships

"T" = Tied

Team appearances
Amateur
European Boys' Team Championship (representing England): 2007, 2008, 2009
Jacques Léglise Trophy (representing Great Britain & Ireland): 2007 (winners), 2008 (winners), 2009 (winners)
European Amateur Team Championship (representing England): 2010 (winners)
St Andrews Trophy (representing Great Britain & Ireland): 2010
Eisenhower Trophy (representing England): 2010

See also
2012 Challenge Tour graduates
2016 European Tour Qualifying School graduates

References

External links

English male golfers
European Tour golfers
Sportspeople from Oxford
People from Abingdon-on-Thames
1991 births
Living people